The Yongcheng–Dengfeng Expressway designated as S32 in Henan's expressway system, is  long regional expressway in Henan and Anhui (designated as S06 in Anhui), China.

Detailed itinerary

References

Expressways in Henan
Transport in Henan